KAMINI (Kalpakkam Mini reactor) is a research reactor at Indira Gandhi Center for Atomic Research in Kalpakkam, India. It achieved criticality on October 29, 1996. Designed and built jointly by the Bhabha Atomic Research Centre (BARC) and Indira Gandhi Centre for Atomic Research (IGCAR) it produces 30 KW of thermal energy at full power.

KAMINI is cooled and moderated by light water, and fueled with uranium-233 metal produced by the thorium fuel cycle harnessed by the neighbouring FBTR reactor.

, it is the world's only thorium-based experimental reactor.

KAMINI was the first and is currently the only reactor in the world designed specifically to use Uranium-233 fuel. Use of the large Thorium reserves to produce Nuclear fuel is a key strategy of India's nuclear energy program.

References

External links
 KAlpakkam Mini Reactor (KAMINI)
Thorium fuel cycle in India:KAMINI fuel
 BBC - Why India wants to turn its beaches into nuclear fuel.html
 Stanford - India - A Key Player in the Future of Thorium

Nuclear technology in India
Nuclear research reactors
Neutron facilities
1996 establishments in Tamil Nadu